Cryptotympana is a genus of cicadas from Southeast Asia, typical of the tribe Cryptotympanini.

Species
The Dmitriev Species File lists:

 Cryptotympana accipiter (Walker, 1850)
 Cryptotympana acuta (Signoret, 1849)
 Cryptotympana albolineata Hayashi, 1987
 Cryptotympana alorensis Hayashi, 1987
 Cryptotympana aquila (Walker, 1850)
 Cryptotympana atrata (Fabricius, 1775) - type species (as Tettigonia pustulata Fabricius, 1787)
 Cryptotympana auripilosa Hayashi, 1987
 Cryptotympana brevicorpus Hayashi, 1987
 Cryptotympana brunnea Hayashi, 1987
 Cryptotympana consanguinea Distant, 1916
 Cryptotympana corvus (Walker, 1850)
 Cryptotympana demissitia Distant, 1891
 Cryptotympana diomedea (Walker, 1858)
 Cryptotympana distanti Hayashi, 1987
 Cryptotympana dohertyi Hayashi, 1987
 Cryptotympana edwardsi Kirkaldy, 1902
 Cryptotympana epithesia Distant, 1888
 Cryptotympana exalbida Distant, 1891
 Cryptotympana facialis (Walker, 1858) (2 subspecies)
 Cryptotympana fumipennis (Walker, 1858)
 Cryptotympana gracilis Hayashi, 1987
 Cryptotympana holsti Distant, 1904 (2 subspecies)
 Cryptotympana immaculata Olivier, 1790
 Cryptotympana incasa Zhang, Sun & Zhang, 1994
 Cryptotympana insularis Distant, 1887
 Cryptotympana intermedia (Signoret, 1849)
 Cryptotympana izzardi Lallemand & Synave, 1953
 Cryptotympana jacobsoni China, 1926
 Cryptotympana karnyi Moulton, 1923
 Cryptotympana kotoshoensis Kato, 1925
 Cryptotympana limborgi Distant, 1888
 Cryptotympana lombokensis Distant, 1912
 Cryptotympana mandarina Distant, 1891
 Cryptotympana miocenica Zhang & Zhang, 1990
 Cryptotympana moultoni Hayashi, 1987
 Cryptotympana niasana Distant, 1909
 Cryptotympana nitidula Hayashi, 1987
 Cryptotympana ochromelas Hayashi, 1987
 Cryptotympana pelengensis Hayashi, 1987
 Cryptotympana praeclara Hayashi, 1987
 Cryptotympana recta (Walker, 1850)
 Cryptotympana robinsoni Moulton, 1923
 Cryptotympana shillana Lee & Mohagan, 2016
 Cryptotympana sibuyana Hayashi, 1987
 Cryptotympana socialis Hayashi, 1987
 Cryptotympana suluensis Distant, 1906
 Cryptotympana takasagona Kato, 1925
 Cryptotympana timorica (Walker, 1870)
 Cryptotympana varicolor Distant, 1904
 Cryptotympana ventralis Hayashi, 1987
 Cryptotympana vesta (Distant, 1904)
 Cryptotympana viridicostalis Hayashi, 1987
 Cryptotympana vitalisi Distant, 1917
 Cryptotympana wetarensis Hayashi, 1987
 Cryptotympana yaeyamana Kato, 1925

References

Cryptotympanini
Cicadidae genera
Fauna of Southeast Asia
Taxa named by Carl Stål